The Independents of Economic, Social and Peasant Action (IAESP) was a small French parliamentary technical group in the Chamber of Deputies of France during the French Third Republic in existence in 1932 and 1936.

It was a small conservative agrarian group composed of members of the Republican, Social and Agrarian Party (PRAS). The PRAS was a small dissident party of the French Agrarian and Peasant Party (PAPF) founded by Louis Guillon.

See also 
Liberalism and radicalism in France
Sinistrisme

 
Defunct political parties in France
Political parties of the French Third Republic
Parliamentary groups in France
1932 establishments in France
1936 disestablishments in France
Political parties established in 1932
Political parties disestablished in 1936